Yıldırım is a Turkish word meaning "lightning" and may refer to:

People

Given name
Ali Yıldırım Koç (born 1967), Turkish businessman and member of the Koç family
Yıldırım Akbulut (1935–2021), Turkish politician
Yıldırım Aktuna (1930–2007), Turkish psychiatrist and politician
Yıldırım Demirören (born 1964), Turkish businessman and president of Turkish Football Federation

Surname
Adnan Yıldırım (1957–1994), Turkish person involved in the Susurluk scandal
Ahmet Yıldırım (born 1974), Turkish footballer
Avni Yıldırım (born 1991), Turkish boxer
Aygün Yıldırım (born 1995), German footballer
Aziz Yıldırım (born 1952), Turkish businessman and former chairman of Fenerbahçe S.K.
Binali Yıldırım (born 1955), Turkish politician and prime minister from May 2016
Bülent Yıldırım (referee) (born 1972), Turkish football referee
Cemal Yıldırım (born 1925), Turkish philosopher of science
Cem Yıldırım (born 1961), Turkish mathematician
Elif Yıldırım (born 1990), Turkish female middle-distance runner
Sezen Aksu (Fatma Sezen Yıldırım) (born 1954), Turkish singer, songwriter and producer
Fatoş Yıldırım (born 1994), Turkish women's footballer
Fehmi Bülent Yıldırım (born 1966), Turkish NGO leader
Gülser Yıldırım (born 1963) Turkish-Kurdish politician 
Haluk Yıldırım (born 1972), Turkish basketball player
Hüseyin Yıldırım (born 1928), convicted Turkish spy of the Cold War era
Irmak Yıldırım (born 2005), Turkish female motocross racer
Mahmut Yıldırım (born 1953), Turkish Olympian contract killer
Mithat Yıldırım (born 1966), Turkish cross-country skier
Murat Yıldırım (actor) (born 1979), Turkish actor
Murat Yıldırım (footballer) (born 1987), Dutch footballer of Turkish descent
Özkan Yıldırım (born 1993), German footballer
Ramazan Yıldırım (born 1975), Turkish footballer and manager
Rıza Yıldırım (born 1987), Turkish wrestler
Rukiye Yıldırım (born 1991), Turkish female taekwondo practitioner
Selma Yildirim (born 1969), Austrian politician
Sercan Yıldırım (born 1990), Turkish footballer
Uğur Yıldırım (born 1982), Dutch footballer of Turkish descent

Nickname
Bayezid I (1354–1403), "Yıldırım Bayezid", Ottoman sultan

Places
Yıldırım, Bursa, a metropolitan district in the center of Bursa, Turkey
Yıldırım, Yenişehir, Turkey
Milia, Famagusta, Northern Cyprus
Yıldırım railway station, a commuter rail station in Ankara, Turkey

Other uses
J-600T Yıldırım, a conventional battlefield ballistic missile system of Turkey
Yıldırım Bosna S.K., a football club in Istanbul, Turkey
Yıldırım Army Group, army group of the Ottoman Empire during World War I

Turkish-language surnames
Turkish masculine given names